The 1902 King's Birthday Honours for Australia were announced on 10 November 1902.

Knight Bachelor
John Winthrop Hackett, MA, Member of the Legislative Council of the State of Western Australia.

Order of Saint Michael and Saint George

Companion of the Order of St Michael and St George (CMG)
 Frederic Dudley North, Esq., Clerk of the Executive Council and Under Secretary in the Premier's Department of the State of Western Australia.

References

External links

1902 awards
Orders, decorations, and medals of Australia